Maritza Chiaway (born 25 February 1975) is a Peruvian swimmer. She competed in the women's 200 metre freestyle, 400 metre freestyle and 800 metre freestyle events at the 1996 Summer Olympics held in Atlanta, Georgia, United States.

References

External links
 

1975 births
Living people
Peruvian female freestyle swimmers
Olympic swimmers of Peru
Swimmers at the 1996 Summer Olympics
Place of birth missing (living people)
20th-century Peruvian women